Joshua Thomas Croft (27 April 1900 – 20 September 1987) was an Australian rules footballer who played with Footscray in the Victorian Football League (VFL).

Notes

External links 

1900 births
1987 deaths
Australian rules footballers from Victoria (Australia)
Western Bulldogs players